Varikkasseri Mana (Malayalam: വരിക്കാശേരി മന), alternatively known as Varikkumanchery Mana, is one of the oldest traditional aristocratic Namboothiri family houses (illam) in Kerala. Built in Kerala architectural style on a plot of land measuring approximately 4 acres, the building is located at Manissery, a village in Ottapalam in Palakkad. It is a popular shooting location for Malayalam films and several commercially successful films such as Devasuram, Aaraam Thampuran, Rappakal were filmed on its premises.

Profile 
The Varikkasseri family is reported to have a history of over 1000 years and the family is known to have occupied a sovereign position among Ashta gruha (Eight Families) Namboothiri families. The Mana was built by Varikkassery Ravi Namboothirippad in or about 1902, using locally available red stone. An expansive padippura (gate house) provides the entry to the three-storied building complex which comprises a nalukettu with 74 rooms, two pathayappuras (outhouses), a large pond and the adjoining bath house, a family temple complex consisting three temples of Shiva, Krishna and Ayyappan, and an oottupura (dining hall), which has since been demolished. It was designed by Krishnan Thampuran, also known as Shilpi Thampuran, of Varikkasseri family, who had earlier studied architecture in Chennai and his exposure to western architecture is seen in the design of the building, especially in the long slender columns surrounding the portico of the building. The beams, doors and windows are made out of wood and are adorned with intricate carvings.

The house was used in a number of Malayalam films, starting with Theertham, the 1987 film made by Mohan. It is reported that the principal photography of over 100 films have been done here which include Devasuram, Aaraam Thampuran, Rappakal, Anandabhadram, Drona, Simhasanam, Madampi, Sufi Paranja Katha, Jana (Tamil), Thooval Kottaram, Valliettan, Kaavalan, Manthrikan , Pretham 2 and Shylock.  Visitors are allowed in the complex when no film is being shot, but access to the ritually pure thevarapura is restricted to Brahmins who intend to perform rituals. The mana is maintained and managed by a trust formed by the current owners of the property, consisting of 10 of the 25 original heirs and some investors who purchased the rights from the remaining 15 heirs.

Varikkassery Krishnan Nampoothirippad was a well-known sculptor. He built the portico for this house in 1940s.

Location 
The Mana is located at Manissery, in Ottappalam, around 42 km from Palakkad, in the south Indian state of Kerala. The nearest railway station is Ottapalam railway station but one may also reach the place via Shornur railway station which is 13 km away. Kozhikode International Airport is the entry point by air, which is situated 62 km away from the Mana.

Gallery

See also 
 Olappamanna Mana
 Poomulli Mana

References

Further reading

External links

 
 
 

Buildings and structures in Palakkad district
Indian noble families
Cultural heritage of India
Ottapalam